The Mary Etta Cox House is a historic house located at 353 North Main Street in Barnegat Township in Ocean County, New Jersey, United States. The house was added to the National Register of Historic Places on March 9, 2005, for its significance in architecture.

See also
National Register of Historic Places listings in Ocean County, New Jersey

References

External links

Barnegat Township, New Jersey
Houses in Ocean County, New Jersey
National Register of Historic Places in Ocean County, New Jersey
Houses on the National Register of Historic Places in New Jersey
Houses completed in 1829
1829 establishments in New Jersey
New Jersey Register of Historic Places